Nils Oscar Priestley (born 18 September 2000) is an English cricketer. He was a graduate of the Cricket Derbyshire Academy in partnership with the University of Derby, and in 2020 accepted a place on the Loughborough MCCU programme. He made his List A debut on 22 July 2021, for Derbyshire in the 2021 Royal London One-Day Cup.

References

External links
 

2000 births
Living people
English cricketers
Derbyshire cricketers
People from Sutton Coldfield